Silje Ask Lundberg (born 13 April 1988 in Oslo) is a Norwegian environmentalist and chairman of Norwegian Society for the Conservation of Nature (Friends of the Earth Norway). She is a former leader of Nature and Youth. She grew up in Harstad in Northern Norway. Prior to her leadership she has been deputy chairman and been working for other environmental organisations, such as ZERO and Bellona Foundation.

References

1988 births
Living people
People from Harstad
Norwegian environmentalists
Nature and Youth activists